Argyresthia tarmanni is a moth of the family Yponomeutidae. It is found in Austria.

References

Moths described in 1993
Argyresthia
Moths of Europe